Georgina Frances Jones, later Georgina Jones Walton and also known as Sister Daya, (September 1, 1882 – September 3, 1955) was an American tennis player. She competed in two events at the 1900 Summer Olympics.

Jones was the daughter of Nevada Senator John P. Jones, co-founder of the town of Santa Monica, California, and Georgina Frances Sullivan. Her sister, Marion Jones Farquhar, also competed in tennis at the 1900 Olympics. Marion was the first woman to win an Olympic medal representing the United States. Jones's other sister, Alice, married Frederick William MacMonnies.

Jones learned to play tennis at the West Side Tennis Club in New York. She later moved to Paris for voice training. She joined the Vedanta Society and was a close follower of Swami Paramananda. As Sister Daya she wrote the book The Guru and the Disciple: My Life with Swami Paramananda. She also wrote a play, "The Light of Asia", which was choreographed by Ruth St. Denis.

References

External links
 

1882 births
1955 deaths
American female tennis players
Olympic tennis players of the United States
Tennis players at the 1900 Summer Olympics
Sportspeople from New York City
Tennis people from New York (state)